Víctor Espinoza Peña (25 May 1947 – 1 March 2021) was a Peruvian politician and fisherman.

Biography
Born in Pucusana, Espinoza Peña finished his primary studies and became an artisanal fisherman. He was elected Deputy District Mayor of Pucusana in the 2018 Lima municipal election alongside Mayor  of the Alliance for Progress party. He became Mayor after Navarro died from COVID-19 on 28 June 2020, during the COVID-19 pandemic in Peru. 

On 6 February 2021, Espinoza Peña reported that he had tested positive for COVID-19. He died on 1 March 2021, the second mayor of Pucusana to die from the virus.

References

1947 births
2021 deaths
Peruvian politicians
Deaths from the COVID-19 pandemic in Peru